Mountain Glen, also known as the Repass-Hudson House, is a historic home located near Ceres, Bland County, Virginia. It was built in the mid- to-late- 1850s, and is a large, two-story, three bay frame house of the double-pile, central-passage form. It has a hipped roof and a full-width front porch added about 1910.

It was listed on the National Register of Historic Places in 1990.

References

Houses completed in the 19th century
Houses on the National Register of Historic Places in Virginia
Central-passage houses
Houses in Bland County, Virginia
National Register of Historic Places in Bland County, Virginia